Who Are You Now is the second studio album by American singer Madison Cunningham, released on August 16, 2019 by Verve Forecast. It received a Grammy Award nomination for Best Americana Album.

Critical reception

In a review for AllMusic, critic Marcy Donelson gave the album 4 out of 5 stars, and wrote "mostly concerned with imperfect relationships, Who Are You Now is confident and intimate in terms of subject matter and expression throughout these variations, all of which put vocal lines front and center. And "Song in My Head" isn't the only earworm."

Track listing

Personnel
Credits are adapted from the Who Are You Now liner notes.

Musicians
 Madison Cunningham — vocals; electric and acoustic guitars; vibraphone
 Tyler Chester — acoustic and baritone electric guitars; electric bass guitar; Ace Tone; piano; harmonium, Wurlitzer 140B; vibraphone; Mellotron; keyboard bass; percussion; timpani
 Alan Hampton — upright, electric and Guild Asbury bass; backing vocals
 Abe Rounds — drums; percussion; Roland TR-606; backing vocals
 Ted Poor — drums; percussion
 Gabe Witcher — violin

Production and artwork
 Tyler Chester – producer
 David Boucher — engineer; mixer
 Mario Ramirez — assistant engineer
 Mauro Castro — assistant engineer
 Tim O'Sullivan — assistant mix engineer
 Tejas Leier Heyden — production assistant
 Eric Boulanger — mastering engineer
 Joe Spix — art direction
 Jacob Lerman — design
 Alexandra Berg — artwork

References

External links

2019 albums
Americana albums